Edel Viola Ski (2 April 1918 – 18 January 2010) was a Norwegian politician for the Labour Party.

She served as a deputy representative to the Parliament of Norway from Buskerud during the term 1961–1965. In total she met during 24 days of parliamentary session.

References

1918 births
2010 deaths
Deputy members of the Storting
Labour Party (Norway) politicians
Buskerud politicians
Women members of the Storting